The Papua New Guinea national rugby league team represents Papua New Guinea in the sport of rugby league football.

In Papua New Guinea, Rugby League is a highly popular sport and is regarded as the country's national sport. The national side are known as the Kumuls ("birds-of-paradise" in Tok Pisin).

History

Rugby league in Papua New Guinea was first played in the late forties; it was introduced to the nation by Australian soldiers stationed there during and after the Second World War. Papua New Guinea were admitted to the game's International Federation in 1974. On 6 July 1975, at Lloyd Robson Oval, in Port Moresby the Kumuls played their first ever international. They were beaten 40-12 by England. The English team were en route to Australia and New Zealand to fulfil away fixtures during the 1975 World Cup.

They first entered the Rugby League World Cup for the 1985-88 competition, though it was not until 2000 that they won away from home. In 1987 The Kumuls staged their first full test playing tour of Britain, after playing BARLA opposition in 1979. The 1987 Tour had The Kumuls play both BARLA and for the first Professional opposition.

On Tuesday 20 October 1987, Cumbria met Papua New Guinea before a crowd of 3,750 at the Recreation Ground, Whitehaven. Cumbria won 22–4. Four days later Papua New Guinea played a Test which was also a World Cup match against Great Britain. They lost the test 42–0 at Central Park, Wigan.

During the 1988 Great Britain Lions tour of Australasia a Test match was played at Port Moresby which like the match at Wigan in 1987 was a World Cup match. Which they also lost 42-22. Later that year Papua New Guinea played a World Cup match against Australia in Wagga Wagga, the Kangaroos recording a then international record winning margin of 62 points with a 70–8 win. Australian winger Michael O'Connor crossed for four tries and kicked seven goals for a personal points haul of 30, which could have been 44 had he not missed seven kicks at goal. In 1990 Papua New Guinea played host to a touring Great Britain, the series ended in a 1–1 draw.

On Sunday 27 October 1991, Papua New Guinea met Wales at Vetch Field, Swansea. Roared on by a fervent crowd of 11,422; Wales won by a record 68-0 margin, scoring thirteen tries. Papua New Guinea never recovered and lost all five matches in Britain, conceding 232 points in the process, and won only one of their four matches in France.

Papua New Guinea wound up their 1991 tour of Europe with a World Cup rated Test match against France, which was played on Sunday 24 November at the Stade Albert Domec, Carcassonne. Despite Papua New Guinea leading 8–4 at half-time; France defeated their visitors 28–14.

The Kumuls hosted Australia for a two test series in October 1991 (won 2-0 by the Kangaroos), and also hosted Great Britain during the 1992 Lions tour of Australasia.

Papua New Guinea travelled to England to compete in the 1995 World Cup under coach Joe Tokam and captain Adrian Lam. In their group was Tonga and New Zealand, against whom they failed to win a match.

In 1996 Bob Bennett, brother of the famous Wayne Bennett, was appointed the Kumuls' coach. Also, in 1996, Adrian Lam captained the 'Papua New Guinea National Rugby League Team' against the Australian Kangaroos (52-6 win to Australia).
Bob Bennett coached the 2000 World Cup Kumuls team to the qualification two the pool were the kumuls made it into the top 4 teams in the world so the 2000 World Cup Kumuls team was rated the best kumuls team.

They were granted automatic qualification to the 2008 World Cup but were placed in a pool with the top three teams, Australia, New Zealand and England, and failed to win a match in the tournament.

PNG automatically qualified for the 2021 Rugby League World Cup having reached the quarter finals of the previous Rugby League World Cup. The 2021 tournament will take place in England.

2010 controversy
The Papua New Guinea team experienced huge difficulties leading to the 2010 Rugby League Four Nations Tournament, as politicians clashed for control over the game and the governing body, the PNGRFL, was split over issues concerning junior development, the national team and the Papua New Guinea NRL bid. This caused Adrian Lam to retire as head coach of the Kumuls in September 2010 while recently retired captain Stanley Gene, who had never coached a side before, was named his replacement. The governing board were adamant that more Papua New Guinea-based players should be in the squad, and fewer Australia-based players should be picked. In early October the squad was announced for the tournament and consisted of 12 PNG-based players with captain Paul Aiton being the only NRL player. Whilst the Australian team for the tournament was worth an estimated A$10 million, local newspapers calculated the Kumuls value at around A$670,000.

Despite the Australian media treating the defeat of the Papua New Guinean team as a mere formality, with the team having odds of 125–1 to win the tournament, the players and journalists at home were positive that the Kumuls could make a lasting impression in the tournament. After their first up 42–0 defeat against Australia, the team's enthusiasm and crunching tackles were praised, but ball control and creativity let the team down hugely. However the team faced much more criticism after their 76-12 thrashing suffered at the hands of New Zealand, with fans angry at the poor display from the players and some questioning the credentials of new coach Stanley Gene. Days after the match a broader look at the sport in the country occurred with one assessment concluding that rugby league was poorly managed and former PNG great Marcus Bai called on clubs to supply a greater number of representative standard players especially from the New Guinea Islands region which had supplied five of this year's team. The way politics had made its way into the governing of the sport was also condemned.

2015 Pacific Rugby League Test

In May 2015, Papua New Guinea took on Fiji in the 2015 Melanesian Cup at Cbus Super Stadium. The International was part of a triple header which also included the Polynesian Cup, between Samoa and Tonga, and the Junior Kangaroos against the Junior Kiwis. The Kumuls never really troubled the Fijians after handling errors and poor decisions led to the Bati easily winning the inaugural Melanesian Cup by 22–10.

2016 Pacific Rugby League Test

In May 2016, Papua New Guinea took on Fiji in the 2016 Melanesian Cup at Pirtek Stadium. The International was part of a triple header which also included the Polynesian Cup, between Samoa and Tonga, and the Junior Kangaroos against the Junior Kiwis. In this year's test, the Kumuls had more experienced players and it paid off. Despite being in a similar situation with the half time score, they managed to make a miraculous comeback not many saw coming, to record their first win 24–22 on away shores since the 2000 World Cup.

2017 Pacific Rugby League Test

The PNG Kumuls won their second consecutive Pacific Cup test victory with a 32–22 victory over the  Cook Islands at Campbelltown Stadium in Sydney, Australia.

2017 Rugby League World Cup

The PNG Kumuls won all their pool games in Port Moresby before losing to England in Melbourne in the quarter final  of the 2017 RLWC.

2018 Pacific Rugby League Test

The PNG Kumuls won their third consecutive  Ox & Palm Pacific Cup test victory with a 26–14 victory over Fiji Bati at Campbelltown Stadium in Sydney, Australia.

2019 Oceania Cup and GB Lions Tour

The PNG Kumuls lost both their 2019 Oceania Cup (rugby league) test matches with a 24–6 loss to Toa Samoa at Leichhardt Oval in Sydney, Australia and a 22–20 loss to Fiji Bati in Christchurch, New Zealand . The Kumuls ended the season on a high defeating the Great Britain Lions 28–10 in Port Moresby.

2022 Pacific Rugby League Test

The Kumuls defeated a full strength Fiji Bati 24-14 on June 25 at Campbelltown Stadium.

2022 Rugby League World Cup

The PNG Kumuls will be based in Warrington for the 2021 RLWC. The World Cup will be held between October 15 and November 19. Kumuls coach Stanley Tepend will be guided by his mentor/ Coaching Director Shane Flanagan. The PM's XIII lost to Australia PM's XIII on September 25 at Suncorp Stadium as part of both teams world cup preparations.

Current squad
The Papua New Guinean squad selected for the 2021 Rugby League World Cup. Club information are as of 3 October 2022. 
Statistics for Papua New Guinea and the players' NRL club records (up to 3 October 2022) drawn from the Rugby League Project. 

Notes
 Age is as the match date, 1 November 2022.
 Players listed in order of jumper number for the 2021 Rugby League World Cup as given in the team list on the NRL website.
 Nene Macdonald played for Sydney Roosters, Gold Coast Titans, St George Illawarra Dragons, North Queensland Cowboys and Cronulla Sharks from 2014 to 2020.
 Lachlan Lam played for Sydney Roosters from 2019 to 2022.
 Wellington Albert played for Widnes Vikings, North Wales Crusaders, Leeds Rhinos, Featherstone Rovers and Keighley Cougars from 2018 to 2021.
 Rhyse Martin played for Canterbury Bulldogs from 2018 to 2019.
 Watson Boas played for Featherstone Rovers in 2018.

Notable players 

 Makali Aizue
 Marcus Bai
 Ngala Lapan
 Aquila Emil
 Kungas Kuveu
 Darius Haili
 Alan Rero
 Stanley Gene
 David Mead
 John Wilshere
 James Segeyaro
 Adrian Lam
 Lachlan Lam
 Bal Numapo
 Justin Olam
 Xavier Coates
 Alex Johnston
 Neville Costigan
 Nene Macdonald

Tournament history

World Cup

Tri-Nations / Four Nations

Pacific Cup

Recent Results
Below are the previous 5 matches of the national team.

International record and ranking
Below is the list of Papua New Guinea's international head-to-head record as of 1 November 2022.

Other Papua New Guinean teams

PNG Prime Minister's XIII - Development side  consisting of players from the Papua New Guinea National Rugby League competition. In recent years, players from the National Rugby League, Intrust Super Cup, English Super League and English Championship have also been selected to play the Australian PM's XIII.
 PNG President XIII - PNGRFL 'select' usually playing another development side like Junior Kangaroos or New Zealand A. Rarely used to play national sides.
 PNG Residents- Papua New Guinea development side made up of solely local players. Regularly playing matches with the Junior Kangaroos, New Zealand Māoris and even national sides.
 Papua New Guinea Kundus - Papua New Guinea Junior U/19 schoolboys side.

Participated tournaments
 Rugby League World Cup
 Rugby League Four Nations (2010 tournament)
 Pacific Cup
 World Sevens 
 Super League World Nines (1996,1997)
 Rugby league nines at the 2015 Pacific Games 
 Rugby league nines at the 2019 Pacific Games 
 Cabramatta International Nines

See also

 Rugby league in Papua New Guinea
 World Cup

References

External links

 
Pacific Rugby League International
National rugby league teams
Rugby league in Papua New Guinea
Rugby League Four Nations